Thomas Fred Walden (June 25, 1890 – September 27, 1955) was a Major League Baseball catcher who played for one season. He played for the St. Louis Browns for one game on June 3 during the 1912 St. Louis Browns season.

External links

1890 births
1955 deaths
Major League Baseball catchers
St. Louis Browns players
Baseball players from Missouri
St. Louis Terriers players
People from Fayette, Missouri